Alexander Frederick Clifford Darwall is a British landowner, hedge fund manager, and millionaire. He is notable for having roles in several large investment companies, his donations to UKIP, the Leave Party, and for his 2022-23 court case where he limited public access to Dartmoor.

Early career 
Darwall received a degree in History from the University of Cambridge. He then trained as an investment analyst with  de Zoete & Bevan (BZW). In 1987, Darwall moved to Paris to become head of the French equity research department for the Swedish group Enskilda Securities. In 1992, he joined Goldman Sachs as a French equity analyst.

Management roles 
In 1995, Darwall joined Jupiter Fund Management. In November 2000, Jupiter European Opportunities was founded and Darwall became the lead portfolio manager. Darwall remained in this role until November 2019, when Jupiter European became European Opportunities Trust PLC, and Darwall stepped down as manager of both Jupiter European and the related Jupiter European Growth investment companies.

In 2019, he founded a company known as Devon Equity Management, whose aim is to "achieve long term capital growth by exploiting special investment opportunities in Europe". Darwell continues to manage the company. Devon Equity Management invests on behalf of the European Opportunities Trust, as well as Luxembourg UCITS SICAV.

Dartmoor legal dispute 
Darwall owns several large tracts of land across the UK. One of these is the 16,000 acre Sutherland Estate in Scotland, which he bought in November 2016 for around £5m. He and his wife entered the national news in 2018 after they started charging gold panners £10 per day, limiting their access area, and limiting their time to two weeks per year, as people were selling the gold, which is not something they believe should be permitted.

Darwall owns the 4,000 acre Blachford Estate in Dartmoor, and has done since 2011. This makes him the sixth largest landowner on Dartmoor. Darwall's Blachford Estate received financial support from the European Agricultural Fund for Rural Development. In 2014, Darwall blocked the public from parking on or riding horses through a section of his land at New Waste.

In 2022, he received media attention for challenging the widely held interpretation of the Dartmoor Commons Act 1985 as including a public right to wild camping on the moor. Historically, wild camping, where no damage has been caused, had been presumed lawful on Dartmoor. In January 2023, the High Court found in Darwall's favour, clarifying that there was no right to wild camp on Dartmoor without the landowner's permission; it was previously the only location in England and Wales where camping without the permission of the landowner was presumed to be legal.

Following the high court decision, Darwall and other landowners struck a deal with the Dartmoor National Park Authority, where they would be paid compensation in return for allowing wild camping on limited portions of their land. The deal was met with disapproval from Right to Roam campaigners. On 21 January 2023, a protest was organised on Darwall's land to protest the decision, with more than 3,000 people in attendance, making it one of the largest countryside access protests since the 1930s. The park authority subsequently announced that it intended to appeal the High Court’s decision.

Local residents also raised concerns that Darwall's release of pheasants on his Dartmoor estate was leading to the endangerment of ecological woodland which is habitat for the Blue Ground Beetle, found in only 15 sites across England and Wales.

Political activity 
Darwall has donated £89,999 to the right-wing UK Independence Party, the Vote Leave campaign supporting a "Leave" vote in the 2016 United Kingdom European Union membership referendum, and the Conservatives between 2014 and 2019. Part of this money included a donation to Anthony Mangnall, the current MP for Totnes, Devon.

Personal life 
Darwall has a wife named Diana.

References 

Land disputes
British hedge fund managers
Living people
Conservative Party (UK) donors
UK Independence Party donors
Year of birth missing (living people)